Martha Revuelta Jiménez (born September 6, 1986, in Mexico City) is a female beach volleyball and volleyball player from Mexico, who played during the Swatch FIVB World Tour 2005 playing with Teresa Galindo.

Participating at the 2003 SWATCH-FIVB U-18 World Championships in Pattaya Thailand, and partnering Diana Estrada, they finished in the 4th place, after losing the bronze medal match 21–19, 17–21, 15-7 from Frederike Fischer-Sandra Piasecki, from Germany.

She also represented her home country at the 2006 Central American and Caribbean Games partnering Vanessa Virgen and winning the silver medal. That year she was the volleyball female recipient of the "Luchador Olmeca" Award.

At the NORCECA Beach Volleyball Circuit 2008 she won the gold medal at the Guadalajara Tournament.

Indoor
She also played indoor volleyball, playing in the 2003, 2007, 2008 and 2009 versions of the Pan-American Cup. She also took part at the tournament during the 2007 Pan American Games and 2002 Central American and Caribbean Games.

Clubs
  IMSS Valle de Mexico
  Porteñas de Veracruz 2009

Awards

Individuals
 2006 Luchador Olmeca
 2006 Borrego de Oro Instituto Tecnológico de Monterrey Campus Cd. de México

References

External links
 
 
 FIVB Indoor Profile

1986 births
Living people
Mexican women's volleyball players
Mexican beach volleyball players
Women's beach volleyball players
Volleyball players at the 2007 Pan American Games
Beach volleyball players at the 2015 Pan American Games
Pan American Games competitors for Mexico
Sportspeople from Mexico City
Central American and Caribbean Games silver medalists for Mexico
Central American and Caribbean Games bronze medalists for Mexico
Competitors at the 2002 Central American and Caribbean Games
Competitors at the 2006 Central American and Caribbean Games
Beach volleyball players at the 2019 Pan American Games
Central American and Caribbean Games medalists in beach volleyball
Central American and Caribbean Games medalists in volleyball
21st-century Mexican women